Team UWS is the sports union of the University of the West of Scotland in Scotland, UK, and competes in Scottish Student Sport and the Scottish Conference of BUCS. The American football team plays in the Scottish/Northern 2A league.

History
Originally formed as SAUWS Sports and Societies in 2008, the sports union was rebranded as Team UWS during 2013. Its vision is "to enhance the student experience by encouraging all students to take part in sport and activities and to promote the benefits of physical and mental health through physical activity."
Previous to the formation of SAUWS, the students associations of the former University of Paisley and Bell College were responsible for sports provision. The larger of the two, the University of Paisley Students Association, was formed from those of Craigie College of Education in Ayr and Paisley College of Technology and had a considerable number of clubs including Ice Hockey, Shinty, Gaelic Football and Curling.
During the 2008/09 academic session attempts were made by Scandinavian and German students to resurrect the Ice Hockey team but failed due to lack of interest the club. Other attempts to recreate former sports clubs included American Football during the 2004–05 British Collegiate American Football League season as the Pyros. The team originally competed as the Paisley College of Technology/University of Paisley Panthers American Football between the 1989–90 British Collegiate American Football League and the 1996–97 British Collegiate American Football League seasons.

Sports sponsored

BUCS
 Archery
 UWS Pyros American Football Team
 Badminton
 Basketball
 Football
 Golf 
 UWS Hockey Club
 Netball
 UWS RFC
 Volleyball
 Track & Field (Indoor & Outdoor)

Scottish Student Sport
 Badminton
 Basketball
 Boxing
 Curling
 Football
 Hockey
 Judo
 Netball
 Rugby Union
 Volleyball

UWS Sports Scholarship Programme
Run by the University, the sport scholarships programme aims to support those with the potential to be at the top of their sport internationally and nationally combining it with academic achievement to help student-athletes achieve their full potential whilst raising the profile and reputation of the University in the sporting and academic arenas. Those who are on the programme are encouraged to attend UWS sports events and support Team UWS participation; to compete for Scottish Universities when selected and available.

Traditions and rivalries
Team UWS's most notable rivalry is with Edinburgh Napier University which compete’s against in the East vs West Varsity. Other rivalries include Glasgow University in Rugby and American Football competitions.

Notable alumni
 Kirsty Gilmour, Badminton Player for Scotland and Great Britain
 Vicki Adams, Team GB Curler 
 Aileen Neilson, Paralympian 
 Fraser Hirst, Scottish National Hockey Team
 Tom Hiddleston, Scottish Universities Rugby player 2008 and 2010

Hall of Fame
 Struan Tonnar, Ice Hockey (2014)
 Rachel Hunter, Athletics (2015)

References

External links
 

University of the West of Scotland
University and college sports clubs in Scotland